A3! is a mobile game franchise produced by Liber Entertainment centered on actors from the fictional talent agency Mankai Company. Music for the series is published by Pony Canyon. Since the series' premiere, the show has released 1 studio album, 16 extended plays, 2 soundtrack albums, and 6 musical theater albums. In addition, 5 singles (4 A-side and 1 character) were released for the series.

Several sub-units formed in the franchise include A3ders! and BRBRookies! A3ders! consists of Sakuya Sakuma (voiced by Kōdai Sakai), Tenma Sumeragi (voiced by Takuya Eguchi), Banri Settsu (voiced by Chiharu Sawashiro), and Tsumugi Tsukioka (voiced by Atsushi Tamaru). BRBRookies consists of Chikage Utsuki (voiced by Wataru Hatano), Kumon Hyodo (voiced by Tasuku Hatanaka), Azami Izumida (voiced by Seiya Konishi), and Guy (voiced by Satoshi Hino).

Albums

Studio albums

Extended plays

Soundtrack albums

Musical theater albums

Singles

A-side singles

Character singles

Other charted songs

Notes

References 

Anime soundtracks
Video game music discographies